The 1985 California Golden Bears football team was an American football team that represented the University of California, Berkeley in the Pacific-10 Conference (Pac-10) during the 1985 NCAA Division I-A football season. In their fourth year under head coach Joe Kapp, the Golden Bears compiled a 4–7 record (2–7 against Pac-10 opponents), finished in last place in the Pac-10, and were outscored by their opponents by a combined total of 265 to 233.

The team's statistical leaders included Kevin Brown with 1,447 passing yards, Ed Barbero with 586 rushing yards, and James Devers with 401 receiving yards.

Schedule

Personnel
Ed Barbero (offense)
QB Brian Bedford
QB Kevin Brown
Cockett (offense)
WR Vince Delgado
Garner (offense)
Hicks (offense)
Houston (offense)
K Rix

References

California
California Golden Bears football seasons
California Golden Bears football